Vanessa Benelli Mosell (born 15 November 1987 in Prato, Tuscany) is an Italian pianist and conductor.

Biography 

Benelli Mosell began playing the piano at the age of three, starting her comprehensive musical studies and giving her first public appearance at four years old. At seven years old, she was exceptionally admitted at the International Piano Academy in Imola where she studied with Franco Scala. She gave her orchestral debut as soloist at the age of nine followed by her New York debut appearance at eleven years old with pianist Pascal Rogé, who described her as "the most natural musical talent I have encountered in my entire life". In 2007 she was invited to the Moscow Tchaikovsky Conservatory to study with Mikhail Voskresensky before pursuing her studies with Dmitri Alexeev at the Royal College of Music in London, where she graduated in 2012, generously supported by the Russell Gander Award. In addition to her piano studies, she went on studying violin, singing, score reading, composition, and conducting.

Career 
Later highlights include her debut at La Scala in Milan and Turin's Teatro Regio at the MiTo Festival; solo recitals at the Muziekgebouw in Amsterdam and at the Seoul Arts Center; a portrait concert at the National Concert Hall, Dublin in Ireland for RTÉ with concerti by Rachmaninov and George Benjamin; chamber music making with the Russian violinist Vadim Repin; an extensive tour of China making celebrated solo debuts at Beijing National Centre for the Performing Arts, Harbin Grand Theater and Chongqing Guotai Arts Center among other venues; praised performances at Salle Gaveau in Paris, performing Chopin's Piano Concerto No. 1 with Orchestre Pasdeloup, and her Rachmaninov album launch recital at Salle Cortot in Paris.

2018 saw her making her debut with the Royal Scottish National Orchestra performing Ravel's Piano Concerto and concerts at the Royal Festival Hall, Southbank Centre, with the London Philharmonic Orchestra, rejoining Southbank three months later for a performance during the 2019 Stockhausen Festival at the Royal Festival Hall. She revisited the Ravel Piano Concerto at Al-Bustan Festival in Beirut and launched the 2019 Festival Presences at Auditorium de Radio France in Paris.

Further orchestral appearances include concerts with the Orchestra of the Teatro Comunale di Bologna, Orchestra of the Teatro Regio di Torino, Orchestre philharmonique de Strasbourg, Münchner Symphoniker, Zurich Chamber Orchestra, Edmonton Symphony Orchestra, Jerusalem Symphony Orchestra and the Moscow Soloists, with whom she replaced Martha Argerich as soloist.

Since making debuts at New York's Lincoln Center, Tonhalle, Zürich, and London's Wigmore Hall, Benelli Mosell has given concerts and solo recitals at Hamburg's Laeiszhalle, Berliner Philharmonie, Auditorio Nacional de Madrid, Palau de la Musica Catalana in Barcelona, Auditorio de Saragoza, Palau de la Musica in Valencia, Auditorium de Radio France and Auditorium du Louvre in Paris, Auditorium Manzoni in Bologna, Sala Verdi in Milan, Dublin National Concert Hall, Haifa Auditorium, Seoul Arts Center, Muziekgebouw Amsterdam, Harbin Grand Theater, Beijing NCPA, London's Royal Festival Hall and Kings Place, La Scala in Milano, Teatro Regio in Turin, Salle Poirel in Nancy, Corum in Montpellier, Théatre de la Criée in Marseille, Bavaria's Schloss Elmau, Glasgow Royal Concert Hall and Usher Hall in Edinburgh.

Benelli Mosell studied conducting with Luca Pfaff in Strasbourg and won awards in festivals in Elba and Pietrasanta. As conductor she has worked with the Vienna Chamber Orchestra, conducting the first performance in Austria of  Incanto (2001). She has also conducted the Divertimento Ensemble in Milan.

Benelli Mosell is internationally renowned for her performances of Karlheinz Stockhausen's Klavierstücke. Following her recording of Klavierstücke I–IV, she was invited by the composer to study under him. She worked closely with the composer and he remains an important influence on Vanessa's music making, encouraging her passion for contemporary music and her championing of composers of today as well as the great classics.

Since becoming a key figure in the music of Stockhausen, Benelli Mosell has had collaborations with many leading contemporary composers including George Benjamin, Hugues Dufourt, Stefano Gervasoni, Martin Matalon and Marco Stroppa among others.

As a chamber music performer she collaborated with Renaud and Gautier Capuçon, Julian Rachlin, Vadim Repin, Massimo Quarta, Daishin Kashimoto, Radovan Vlatkovich and his frequent partner the French cellist Henri Demarquette, with whom she released the album Echoes for Decca, a juxtaposition of works by Philip Glass and Sergei Rachmaninoff for cello and piano.

Discography 
Benelli Mosell's debut recording Introducing Vanessa Benelli Mosell, Virtuoso Piano Music features music by Prokofiev, Haydn, Scriabin and Liszt and received great international praise for her "extraordinary artistic talent" and "sparkling technique in demanding music" (Gramophone Magazine). Her debut recording was quickly followed up in September 2012 by her second, equally acclaimed Liszt recital. In spring 2015, Benelli Mosell released her recording, and debut on the Decca label – a juxtaposition of Karol Beffa, Stockhausen and Stravinsky and followed this in 2016 with Light, a further disc in her Stockhausen series. She has received universal praise for her concerto debut CD of Rachmaninoff's Piano Concerto No. 2 with the London Philharmonic Orchestra. She now has five releases for Decca Classics, most recently a disc of Debussy's Preludes Book I and Suite bergamasque.

Benelli Mosell is a Steinway Artist.

References

External links 

Profile, LoganArts Management

Italian women pianists
Italian conductors (music)
Women conductors (music)
Living people
1987 births
People from Prato
21st-century pianists
Women classical pianists
21st-century women pianists